Goulding is an English surname of Old English origin.

People
 Aaron Goulding (born 1982), Australian football player
 Alfred J. Goulding (1898–1972), Australian-born American film director and screenwriter
 Bobbie Goulding (born 1972), English rugby league football coach and former player
 Cathal Goulding (1923–1998), Chief of Staff of the Irish Republican Army and the Official IRA
 Chris Goulding (born 1988), Australian basketballer
 Darrell Goulding (born 1988), English professional rugby league footballer
 Edmund Goulding (1891–1959), British film writer and director
 Ellie Goulding (born 1986), British singer-songwriter
 Frederick Goulding (1842–1909), British printer of etchings and lithographs
 Grantley Goulding (1874–1947), British athlete
 Sir Irvine Goulding (1909–2000), British judge
 Jane Goulding (born 1957), retired field hockey player from New Zealand
 Jeff Goulding (born 1984), British footballer
 Julia Goulding (born 1985), British actress
 Marrack Goulding (1936–2010), British diplomat
 Phil G. Goulding (1921–1998), American newspaper reporter
 Ray Goulding (1922–1990), American comedian
 Valerie Goulding (1918–2003), Irish campaigner for disabled people and senator
 Warren Goulding (born 1950), Canadian journalist and author

See also
 Goulding (disambiguation)
 Golding, a surname
 Goldin, a Jewish surname

References

Surnames of English origin